Debre Tabor Airport is an airport at Debre Tabor, Ethiopia .

Scheduled services

History

Conquest by the Tigray Defense Forces
As part of its counter-offensive in the Tigray War, the TPLF, on 18 August 2021, the Tigray People's Liberation Front tried to take control of Debre Tabor Airport but failed.

References

Ethiopian Airlines Routes

Airports in Ethiopia
Amhara Region